Annabel Schasching (born 26 July 2002) is an Austrian footballer. She plays for the Austria women's national football team.

She competed at the  2019 UEFA Women's Under-17 Championship, and UEFA Women's Euro 2022.

On the club level, she plays for Sturm Graz.

References 

2002 births
Austrian women's footballers
Living people
Women's association footballers not categorized by position